Aleksandar Šofranac (born 21 October 1990) is a Montenegrin professional football centre back who currently plays for Albanian Superliga club Dinamo Tirana  and the Montenegro national team.

International career
Šofranac made his debut for Montenegro in a March 2016 friendly match against Belarus and has, as of 16 October 2020, earned a total of 6 caps, scoring no goals.

Career statistics

Honours

Player

Club
Rijeka
1. HNL: 2016–17
Croatian Cup: 2016–17

Sarajevo
Bosnian Premier League: 2018–19
Bosnian Cup: 2018–19

References

External links

 
 Aleksandar Šofranac Stats at utakmica.rs

1990 births
Living people
Sportspeople from Cetinje
Association football central defenders
Montenegrin footballers
Montenegro under-21 international footballers
Montenegro international footballers
OFK Titograd players
FK Javor Ivanjica players
FK Sutjeska Nikšić players
HNK Rijeka players
Cercle Brugge K.S.V. players
FK Sarajevo players
Montenegrin Second League players
Montenegrin First League players
Serbian SuperLiga players
Serbian First League players
Croatian Football League players
Challenger Pro League players
Premier League of Bosnia and Herzegovina players
Montenegrin expatriate footballers
Expatriate footballers in Serbia
Montenegrin expatriate sportspeople in Serbia
Expatriate footballers in Croatia
Montenegrin expatriate sportspeople in Croatia
Expatriate footballers in Belgium
Montenegrin expatriate sportspeople in Belgium
Expatriate footballers in Bosnia and Herzegovina
Montenegrin expatriate sportspeople in Bosnia and Herzegovina